Monsp Records is a Finnish record label founded by Keijo "Kepe" Kiiskinen in 1997 and owned by Warner Music Group since May 2019.

From punk to hip hop

Some of the first releases of Monsp Records in the late 1990s featured punk music, but since then, the company has mostly released rap and hip hop music. Their first rap release was an EP Aina vanteilla by Memmy Posse in 2002. The company's most successful release to date is the debut album Mustaa kultaa by Jare & VilleGalle which also earned Monsp Records their first Gold Record.

Current artists
DJ Kridlokk
Eevil Stöö
Flegmaatikot
Gasellit
Huge L
Karri Koira
Kemmuru
Koti6
Loost koos
Musta Barbaari
Nopsajalka
Notkea Rotta
Pietari
Pyhimys
Ruger Hauer
Ruudolf
Solonen
Steen1
Tuuttimörkö
Ville Kalliosta

References

External links

Finnish record labels
Record labels established in 1997